Thomas M. Simpson (1904 – after 1928) was a Scottish professional footballer who played as an outside right in the Scottish League for Dundee United and in the English Football League for Brighton & Hove Albion.

Life and career
Simpson was born in Dundee in 1904. He played junior football for Dundee club Osborne before signing for Dundee United in December 1923. He became a regular in the side, and made a major contribution to their promotion to the Scottish First Division in 1924–25. After more than 100 appearances in league and cup competition over three-and-a-half seasons, he left for English club Brighton & Hove Albion for a £250 fee. He played 30 times in the Third Division South before returning to Scotland where he joined Montrose.

References

1904 births
Year of death missing
Footballers from Dundee
Scottish footballers
Association football outside forwards
Dundee United F.C. players
Brighton & Hove Albion F.C. players
Montrose F.C. players
Scottish Football League players
English Football League players